Chen Lili may refer to:
 Chen Lili (model)（）
 Chen Lili (singer)（）